Benjamin Grant Ferguson (born August 28, 1981) is an American cable television talk show host and a radio talk show host on 600WREC/Memphis, TN. His radio show originates from his home in Texas. His nationally syndicated radio show, The Ben Ferguson Show, airs throughout the United States Sunday nights on Radio America and is syndicated by ICON Radio Network. Since 2018, his show The Ferguson File has aired middays on CRTV, which in December 2018 merged with BlazeTV to form Blaze Media. He is also a regular political commentator on CNN.

Early life and education
Ben Ferguson was born to Bruce and Karen Ferguson on August 28, 1981. He has an older sister, Holly. Ferguson was homeschooled by his mother in Memphis, TN through the tenth grade. Ben has Scottish ancestry. A local talk-radio host throughout his teens, Ferguson attended Tusculum College, but later, graduated from Westminster Academy.  He went on to the University of Mississippi, intending to play tennis; he became a member of Kappa Alpha Order fraternity. He graduated from Ole Miss in 2004.  Ben married Anna Bradley Ferguson in March 2010.

Political activities
Ferguson is a member of Students for Saving Social Security (S4).  In July 2005, as S4's political director, Ferguson was selected by the White House to join President Bush and Ben Stein for a town hall meeting in an effort to educate the public on the issue of social security reform.  Ferguson also spends several weeks a year on the road speaking at youth leadership conferences, high schools and college campuses nationwide.  He has become a regular keynote speaker for several groups, including Congressional Youth Leadership and Lead America.

Ferguson is an avid critic of former Memphis Mayor W. W. Herenton.  When Herenton resigned and then decided to run again for mayor not two weeks later, Ferguson entered the political scene and pulled a petition to run for Memphis City Mayor.  He withdrew from the election when Herenton also withdrew.

Broadcasting career 
At 13, Ben Ferguson became the youngest radio talk show host in the country, and the youngest nationally syndicated host at 20. Ferguson published his first book, a political work, “It’s My America Too,” published by William Morris/Harper Collins in 2004 which USA Today named a “top choice read.” 

In August 2007, Ferguson joined 600 WREC in Memphis as its morning radio host. He was then moved to the afternoon drive show from 4 to 7pm CT.[4] On April 20, 2010, Ferguson resigned from WREC. In a statement he said, "I have left the station, effective today. I’m looking forward to a new market and a new show, in addition to my national show and my continuing appearances on such networks as CNBC, CNN and MSNBC."

Later, it was stated that Ferguson left WREC after an impasse in contract negotiations. It was then announced that Ben Ferguson would take over the 4–7pm slot on another local radio station, KWAM. Controversial radio host Thaddeus Matthews was fired to make room for Ferguson.

On April 1, 2012, Ferguson became the regular fill-in for Mark Davis on WBAP in Texas, as Davis was involved in contract disputes with the new owners of WBAP, Cumulus Media. When a new contract could not be reached between Mark Davis and Cumulus, Ferguson became the permanent host of the 9–11am CT time slot. Ben currently lives in Dallas, Texas.[5]

Ferguson's national talk-radio show focuses on current events from a conservative point of view. The Ben Ferguson Show can be heard over ICON Radio Network weekly on Sunday evenings from 7 to 10pm ET.

Ferguson hosted a local radio show in Memphis during evening drive time slot (from 4 to 7pm) weekdays on WREC (600 AM) in Memphis until April 20, 2010.  On May 3, 2010, KWAM 990 announced that he would be their new evening drive time host. On April 25, 2011, Ben moved to WKIM 98.9 FM, coinciding with a format change in the station to an all-talk network.

In late 2018, Ferguson moved to CRTV, the channel founded by Mark Levin's Conservative Review, to host a midday talk show called 'The Ferguson File'. In December of that year, CRTV merged with Glenn Beck's BlazeTV to form Blaze Media, and Ferguson's show moved to the new combined channel, which is carried by numerous cable systems across the country as well as streamed online. In January 2021, Ferguson announced a podcast deal with Premiere Networks that allowed his show to be part of the iHeartRadio podcast network.

He also appears frequently on Fox News Channel, MSNBC, CNBC, Fox Business, CNN, and CNN Headline News.

Republican National Convention appearance 
Ferguson addressed the 2004 Republican National Convention.  His speech was quoted in various news outlets, including the Chicago Tribune, Toronto Star and Pittsburgh Post-Gazette.

Bibliography
It's My America Too: A Leading Young Conservative Shares His Views on Politics and Other Matters of Importance, 2004, William Morrow

References

External links
Ferguson's Network Talk Show Website
Talk Shows USA Announcement
News Article on His Departure from WREC
 
 

American talk radio hosts
1981 births
Living people
University of Mississippi alumni